Below is a list of Knights and Dames Grand Cross of the Order of St Michael and St George.

 
 An asterisk (*) indicates a Dame Grand Cross.

George III (Regency)

George IV

William IV

Victoria

Edward VII

George V

Edward VIII

George VI

Elizabeth II

Charles III

See also
List of Knights and Ladies of the Garter
List of Knights and Ladies of the Thistle
List of Knights Grand Cross of the Order of the Bath
List of Knights Grand Cross of the Order of the British Empire

References

 
Saint Michael and Saint George